Udinoor  is a village in Kasaragod district in the state of Kerala, India.

Etymology
The name Udinoor is derived from the name of Udayanan, who was one among the Kolathiris. Udinoor is a part of Allada Swaroopam.

Temples
The famous Kshetrapalaka temple, Udinnor Koolom, is situated in the central part of Udinoor. Lord Kshetrapalaka is considered the landlord of the village. Pattutsavam and Arayalin Kleezhil Ottakolam are the main festivals, occurring yearly in this village.

Education
The main educational institution in Udinoor are Udinoor Central AUPS and GHSS Udinoor.

Festivals
Kinathil Arayalin Keezhil Ottakkolam is famous for the number of people participating. This festival is followed by fireworks. Kinathil is treated as the cultural capital of Udinoor because of the famous Jwala theaters and Samskarika Samithi Vayanasala.

Demographics
, Udinoor had a population of 11258, with 5323 males and 5935 females.

Transportation
Local roads have access to NH.66, which connects to Mangalore in the north and Calicut in the south. The nearest railway station is Cheruvathur on the Mangalore-Palakkad line. There are airports at Mangalore and Calicut.

References

Cheruvathur area